Brighid Nic Gearailt  (c.1589–between 1661 and 1682) was an Irish poet and noblewoman.

Biography
Brighid Nic Gearailt, also known as Brighid Chill Dara (Brighid of Kildare), was the daughter of the 12th Earl of Kildare Henry FitzGerald and Lady Frances Howard, daughter of the Earl of Nottingham. When her father died in 1597 she was sent to live with her grandmother, Mabel Browne, Countess of Kildare, in Maynooth. She went on to marry Ruairí Ó Domhnaill, Earl of Tyrconnell at some point after 1603 when she was around fourteen. Her son, his heir was born in 1606 in Maynooth, and became known as Hugh Albert or Hugh O'Donnell, 2nd Earl of Tyrconnell, having inherited the title upon his father's death in 1608, and long before the attainder of 1614.

Brighid was pregnant when her husband fled the country in the Flight of the Earls with his son. There is evidence that her husband tried to have her join him in Europe but that the English authorities prevented it. Brighid went to England where their daughter Mary Ní Dhomhnaill was born. Rory died in Rome on 12 August 1608. Mary was placed under the patronage of the King and Brighid was sent back to Ireland. She later married Nicholas Barnewall, 1st Viscount Barnewall from Turvey, County Dublin. They had nine children.

She wrote in Irish, but only one of her poems has survived, a work in an elegant classical style from about 1607.

See also 
 Irish poetry
 Irish syllabic poetry

References and sources

16th-century Irish women
17th-century Irish women
17th-century nobility
Brighid
People of Elizabethan Ireland
People from County Kildare
Tyrconnell
Barnewall
Daughters of Irish earls
1661 deaths
Year of birth uncertain